Jeffrey Beecroft (born April 1, 1956) is an American production designer. He was nominated for an Academy Award in the category Best Art Direction for the film Dances with Wolves.

Selected filmography
 Dances with Wolves (1990)
 The Bodyguard (1992)
 12 Monkeys (1995)
 The Game (1997)
 Message in a Bottle (1999)
 Pain & Gain (2013)
 Transformers: Age of Extinction (2014)
 13 Hours: The Secret Soldiers of Benghazi (2016)
 Transformers: The Last Knight (2017)
 A Quiet Place (2018)
 6 Underground (2019)

References

External links

1956 births
Living people
American production designers
Artists from Sacramento, California